Francisco Villagrán Kramer (5 April 1927 – 12 July 2011) was a Guatemalan lawyer and social democrat who served as vice president in the government of General Romeo Lucas García, beginning in 1978.  He resigned from office on 1 September 1980, before his term ended, citing differences with the Lucas administration and disapproval of Guatemala's worsening human rights situation. He then went into voluntary exile in the United States, taking a position in the Legal Department of the Inter-American Development Bank.

Villagrán later served on the Inter-American Juridical Committee of the Organization of American States (OAS) and on the United Nations' International Law Commission. In 1994 he was elected to the Guatemalan Congress, where he was president of the Committee on Human Rights.

In 1997, he was nominated for a seat on the OAS's Inter-American Commission on Human Rights.  The nomination raised strong criticism based on the allegation that death squads had been active in Guatemala during his time as vice-president.

Villagrán authored more than two dozen books and dozens of articles on international law and Guatemalan history and politics. In Biografía Política de Guatemala he described his involvement with the Lucas administration as a failed attempt to exert a moderating influence on an authoritarian regime.

References

External links
History of Guatemala chapter 9, (includes text of resignation)
worldpolicy.org
Inter-American Juridical Committee

Vice presidents of Guatemala
Members of the Congress of Guatemala
People of the Guatemalan Civil War
International Law Commission officials
1927 births
2011 deaths
Guatemalan people of German descent
Guatemalan officials of the United Nations
Guatemalan expatriates in the United States